Protylopus is an extinct genus of camel that lived during middle to late Eocene some 50-40 million years ago in North America.

Based on its teeth, it probably fed on the soft leaves of forest plants. Protylopus's front legs were shorter than the hind legs, and ended in four-toed feet. The hind legs also ended in four toes, but most of the weight was carried by the third and fourth, so it may have raised itself up on its back legs like the modern day gerenuk antelope to feed. The shape of the toes suggests that the animal possessed hooves, rather than the foot-pads of modern camels.

References

Prehistoric tylopods
Eocene even-toed ungulates
Eocene mammals of North America
Transitional fossils
Prehistoric even-toed ungulate genera
Fossil taxa described in 1898